North School may refer to:

 North School (Kensington, New Hampshire), a one-room schoolhouse listed on the National Register of Historic Places
 North School (Portland, Maine), also listed on the NRHP
 The North School, a secondary school in Ashford, England

See also 
 North High School (disambiguation)